AM-679 is a drug which acts as a selective inhibitor of 5-Lipoxygenase-activating protein (FLAP). This protein is involved in the production of cysteinyl leukotrienes which are involved in inflammation, and AM-679 has anti-inflammatory effects in animal studies.

References

Indoles
Tert-butyl compounds